Camellia chrysanthoides (薄叶金花茶) is a species of camellia endemic to Longzhou and Pingxiang counties in Guangxi province, China. It is a shrub or small tree growing between 1.5 and 5 meters in height, with yellow flowers. It is endangered in the wild, with about 20-100 mature individuals remaining.

Synonyms
 Camellia longzhouensis
 Camellia xiashiensis

References

 Acta Sci. Nat. Univ. Sunyatseni 1979(3): 73 1979.
 The Plant List
 IUCN Red List
 Flora of China

chrysanthoides